Saidpur Stadium is located by the Saidpur Hospital, Saidpur, Nilphamari, Bangladesh.

See also
Stadiums in Bangladesh
List of cricket grounds in Bangladesh

References

Cricket grounds in Bangladesh
Football venues in Bangladesh